Comănești is a town in Bacău County, Western Moldavia, Romania, with a population of 19,568 as of 2011. It is situated on the river Trotuș, which flows between the Ciuc and the Tarcău mountains;  of the course of the river pass through Comănești.

The town administers two villages, Podei and Vermești.

History
The area of the town of Comănești has been inhabited since the Neolithic period - Neolithic remains were found in the Vermești area of the town. The name is derived from the Cumans who once ruled the region. Its first written record dates from 1657, and its first presence on a map from the 1696 Sanson Map.

From the late 18th century onwards, the town was in the domain of the Ghica family of boyars, who remained an important presence in the area until the middle of the 20th century. The Ghica Palace (now housing the local museum), the park in front of the museum, and the railway stations are testimonies to their presence in the town.

During the summers of 2004, 2005, and 2006, Comănești suffered severe flooding of the Trotuș. Some specialists have associated those floods with the deforestation in the area. In 2006 and 2008, Comănești was the site of large explosion-like sounds that were not identified.

Industry
As of 2003, it had an unemployment rate of 18.1%, much higher than the country's average, and the town was declared an underdeveloped region.

The town is in the center of a large coal field and there are also smaller amounts of oil in the area.  The coal mine, which in 1989 employed 5,000 people, was finally  closed down in 2005, leaving the last group of miners (260 in all) unemployed. The other major industry of the town is forestry, but the large lumberyard and factory were also closed; this area of enterprise is now dominated by small local businesses, but in the last few years some international investors started to appear in the city, especially in retail and commerce.

There have been new initiatives in recent months to attract investment into the area in both the industrial and tourism sectors.

Train station
The Comănești train station was built in 1899, modeled on the Lausanne and Curtea de Argeș railway stations. The design was done by the Italian architect , while the construction was done by the engineer Elie Radu.

See also
 Cuman people

References

External links

  Official website 
  City Hall Official website

Populated places in Bacău County
Localities in Western Moldavia
Towns in Romania
Monotowns in Romania
Mining communities in Romania
Ghica family